Saint Zlata of Maglen (died October 18, 1795) is an 18th-century Eastern Orthodox saint and new martyr.

Zlata was born in the eighteenth century in the village of Slatina, in the province of Meglen (today Chrysi, Greece), to a poor, peasant family with three other daughters. She died on October 18, 1796. The Bulgarian Orthodox Church celebrates her feast day on October 18; the Greek, the Russian, the Serbian and the Macedonian Orthodox Church Orthodox churches - on October 13. Her hagiography was written by Nicodemus the Hagiorite. In Bulgaria and North Macedonia Saint Zlata is often depicted as young woman, wearing a traditional folk costume.  In Bulgaria, Saint Zlata is patron saint of all Bulgarians living abroad.

Sources

Житие и страдание на Света Великомъченица Злата Мъгленска. (Life and Suffering of Saint Great Martyr Zlata of Maglen'') 
Национална библиотека "Св.св. Кирил и Методий" 
Страдање Свете великомученице ЗЛАТЕ Мегленске (Suffering of Saint Great Martyr Zlata of Maglen) 

Bulgarian saints
18th-century Eastern Orthodox martyrs
1795 deaths
Christian saints killed by Muslims
Serbian saints of the Eastern Orthodox Church
Year of birth unknown